Swingin' Machine is an album by American pianist, vocalist and composer Mose Allison recorded for the Atlantic label in 1962.

Reception

Allmusic awarded the album 2 stars with its review by Eugene Chadbourne stating, "adding horns to Allison's band just doesn't work that well. ...All the vocal tracks here are fine... In all, an enjoyable album but a bit disappointing".

Track listing
All compositions by Mose Allison except as indicated
 "Swingin' Machine" – 2:31
 "Do It" – 4:33
 "Stop This World" – 3:24
 "Promenade" – 5:10
 "If You're Goin' to the City" – 3:49
 "Saritha" – 4:58
 "I Ain't Got Nothin' but the Blues" (Duke Ellington, Don George) – 3:56
 "So Rare" (Jerry Herst, Jack Sharpe) – 5:02
Recorded at Atlantic Studios in NYC on November 8 (tracks 2, 4, 5 & 7) and November 9 (tracks 1, 3, 6 & 8), 1962

Personnel 
Mose Allison – piano, vocals
Jimmy Knepper – trombone
Jim Reider – tenor saxophone
Addison Farmer – bass 
Frankie Dunlop – drums

References 

1963 albums
Mose Allison albums
Atlantic Records albums
Albums produced by Nesuhi Ertegun